Belleeks  is a small village and townland in south County Armagh, Northern Ireland. In the 2011 Census it had a reported population of 375. It lies within the Newry, Mourne and Down District Council area and the historic barony of Upper Fews.

Location 
Belleeks lies between the villages of Camlough and Newtownhamilton, on the A25 between the Newtownhamilton and Newry. The nearest large town is Newry, approximately 7 miles to the east and Whitecross is the nearest settlement approximately 2 miles to the north. Belleeks lies in the townland of Belleeks Lower.

Demography 
At the time of the 2001 census, returns for the Belleeks-Blackrock-Tullyah electoral area, reported that:
 26.0% were under 16 years old and 12.6% were aged 60 and above;
 The average age of a resident of the village was 30.8 years old;
 46.3% of the population were male and 53.7% were female;
 95.5% were from a Catholic Community Background;
 4.5% were from a Protestant or 'Other Christian' community background;
 13.7% had degree level or higher qualifications
 56.5% were economically active, 43.5% were economically inactive;
 6.7% were unemployed, of these 42.9% were long-term unemployed;
 68.3 stated reported their health was 'good';
 3.22 was the average family size;
 81.8% of households reported they had access to a private motor vehicle;
 75.9% of homes were owner occupied and 25.5% of all homes were owned outright.

Features and economy 
Saint Laurence O'Toole's Roman Catholic Church sits in a prominent location above the village whilst a Church of Ireland church and Orange Hall lie between Belleeks and Whitecross. The village has two public houses, a small store, a part-time factory and a public common in the village centre. The village has developed from a linear settlement along the A25 as late as the 1960s with the addition of five private and local authority housing developments since the 1970s.

Most residents work away from the village. The largest local industry remaining is agriculture. Belleeks is served by the number 44 Ulsterbus service from Newry to Newtownhamilton a number of times daily as well as the number 40 service between Newry and Whitecross.

Education 
There are two primary schools in or near the village; St. Brigid's Primary School and St. Laurence O'Toole's Primary School. Secondary schooling of residents takes place primarily at St. Paul's High School in Bessbrook, or else in Newtownhamilton or Newry.

Sport
Belleeks has a Gaelic Athletic Club, Laurence O'Toole's (Cumann Lorcáin Uí Thuathail), which competes in underage and senior men's and ladies' football as well Scor and other Armagh GAA competitions. The clubhouse is in Shaughan in the townland of Belleeks Upper.

History

Early history
The area in which Belleeks is situated has been populated for many thousands of years but contains less in terms of easily discernible pre-historic remains than is widely evident in other parts of south County Armagh.  What was to become the village of Belleeks was once the site of a Tudor garrison, besieged and taken during the Great O'Neill's rebellion. The area which was to become the village was held in the estates of Hugh Boy O'Hanlon in 1641, one of the few Catholic gentry retaining substantial landholdings in County Armagh following the Plantation of Ulster, prior to the Rising of that year. Situated in the estates of the Earls of Gosford by the eighteenth century, the modern settlement largely owes its origins to the then current earl, who, in the 1790s created a planned village on the site. Prior to the Irish Land Acts, the Earls of Gosford retained a large Deerpark on the outskirts of the village, whose impressive 18th century walls still bound the settlement to the east.

Pre-20th Century
By the early 19th century, a hamlet had developed at Belleeks along the Newtownhamilton-Newry road which branches off to Whitecross at Belleeks, Indeed, in February 1767 Sir Archibald Acheson was granted a patent to hold fairs in the village on the 3rd days of February, May, August and November every year, all bar which the February fair survived up until 1852.

Census returns for the period between 1841 and 1851, during which the Famine occurred show a decrease in population of the village and surrounding area greater than one quarter of population in the ten-year period due to death and emigration. During the 19th century, however, the settlement acted as the commercial centre for the surrounding region, with residents of outlying districts and nearby villages bringing butter, cheese, and other produce to Belleeks for sales and export to Belfast, and beyond.

The Troubles 1969-1998
For more information on The Troubles, see The Troubles in Belleeks (Armagh), which includes a list of incidents in Belleeks during the Troubles resulting in two or more fatalities.

References

External links 
Belleeks GAC Website
Conflict Archive on the Internet

See also 
List of villages in Northern Ireland

Villages in County Armagh
Townlands of County Armagh